Mahalakshmi is an Indian Tamil-language soap opera starring Kavya Shastry, Hemanth Kumar and Sonu Satheesh Kumar. The series premiered on Sun TV on 6 March 2017 and ended on 14 December 2019 for 805 Episodes and was replaced by Chocolate serial. It was produced by Vision Time India Pvt Ltd and directed by R.Karthikeyan.

Synopsis
It is the story of Mahalakshmi, who follows non violence and discipline. She takes a crucial step just before her engagement with her uncle's son. She files a sexual harassment case against Aravind, a widower with a baby daughter, which creates havoc in her life while Subramani and Meenakshi support her. Vishalam and Ramya create more problems between Aravind and Mahalakshmi. But Mahalakshmi overcomes them and also helps others in overcoming their problems.

ther Story
In episodes between (1-58) the big lovable fight between father (Mohan Sharma) and daughter (Kavya Shastry). It creates a havoc in her life.

Cast

Main Cast
 Kavya Shastry as Mahalakshmi Aravind: Aravind's Second Wife (She is the adoptive mother of Samyukutha and  She is Vishwanthan's daughter).
 Hemanth as Aravind: Anjali and Mahalakshmi's  husband. He is Subramani's and Meenakshi's second son. 
 Sindhu Sadhana as Nithya Manjari & Roopa Manjari (twin sisters) dual roles. (Mahalakshmi dual best friends)
 Sonu Satheesh Kumar as Ramya: Vishalam's daughter and Aravind's ex fiancée(Main Antagonist)
 Lakshmi Raj as Mari Muthu a.k.a. Mark Mari (Episodes:721-804)(Antagonist)
Baby Varshitha as Samyukutha (Mahalakshmi adoptive daughter; Anjali's and Aravind's biological daughter)

Recurring Cast
 Delhi Kumar as Subramani; Raju, Aravind, Karthik and Aarthi's father    
 Anuradha Krishnamoorthy as Meenakshi Subramani: Raju, Aravind, Karthik and Aarthi's mother   
 Gemini as Velu  (Velu Vaathiyar) (Mahalakshmi's Old teacher)
 Narmadha as Kokila (Velu's first daughter).
 Ramya as Chitra (Velu's second daughter).
 Raagavi as Vishalam (Ramya's mother)(Antagonist)
 Bushmi as Aarthi ; Aravind,Raju,Karthick's sister.
 Yuvanraj Nethran as Raju: Aravind, Karthik and Aarthi's elder brother
 Sudha Sandheep as Kavitha Raju: Raju's wife 
 Baby Sana as Kaviya (Raju and Kavitha's daughter)
 Master Sharvan as Shree Hari (Raju and Kavitha's son)
 Aravesh as Karthik: Aravind and Raju's younger brother
 Aishwarya Sesadhari as Eshwari Karthik: Airavathy's daughter and Karthik's wife 
 Gokul as Manikanda
 Mangaleshwari as Shardha (Mari's mother)
 Comedy Krishnamoorthy as Gangadharan (Mari's father)
 Kiruba as Airavathy Krishnamoorthy: Madhankumar and Eshwari's mother(Antagonist)
 Madhuraa as Parvathi Madhan: Mahalakshmi's adoptive sister 
 Shiva as Krishnamoorthy: Madhankumar and Eshwari's father
 Rajesh kumar as Rajesh (Velu Vaathiyar old Student)
Sathyapriya as Vijayalakshmi (Anjali's grandmother)
 Murghanandham as Arumuga (Mukka)

Past Cast
 Anjali Rao as Anjali (Died in serial)
 Lokesh Bhaskaran as Gowtham (Lead Role)
 Priya as Janaki Vishwanathan (Died in serial)
 Sujatha Panju as Advocate Sree Devi
 Pasi Sathya as Ponnamma
 Rajasekhar as Ehswaramoorthy
 Rajalakshmi as Eshwar's mother
 Pramodini Pammi as Ambigai (Anjali's mother)
 Vizhuthugal Santhanam as Ramachandran (Gowtham's father)
 Nathan Shyam as Vignesh
 Shyam as Inspector Paandi
 Veena Venkatesh as Susheela Ramachandran (Gowtham's mother) 
 Mohan Sharma as Vishwanathan (Mahalakshmi's father) 
 Kamal as Arun Kumar (Mahalakshmi's old classmate)
 Bobby Bilani as Anand
 Vallab as Aravind (Replaced by Hemanth)
 Baby Shamilly as Young Samyuktha (Aravind and Anjali's daughter)
 Sharath Raj as Sampath
 Mithun as Bramma
 Vicky Roshan as Madhankumar (Parvathi's husband, Died in serial)

Casting
This is the first serial of actress Kavya Shastry in Tamil-language who is known for her first Serial in Kannada Language like Shubhavivaha. Anjali Rao  appeared in flash back sequences. Lokesh and Hemanth portray the male lead role.

Other supporting cast include Delhi Kumar, Mohan Sharma, Rajasekhar, Priya, Santhanam. Sonu Satheesh Kumar well known for Sthreedhanam serial portrayed the main antagonist role.

References

External links 
 Official Website 

Sun TV original programming
2010s Tamil-language television series
Tamil-language television shows
2017 Tamil-language television series debuts
2019 Tamil-language television series endings